Astartea fascicularis is a species of flowering plant in the myrtle family, Myrtaceae. It is endemic to southwestern Western Australia, where it is widespread in the Recherche Archipelago and present on the mainland in Cape Le Grand National Park. It is commonly known as Recherche astartea. or false baeckea.

Description
This species is a shrub usually reaching up to 1.5 metres tall at windy sites and about 3 metres in maximum height in sheltered areas. It may have single or multiple stems and may layer. New stems are reddish in colour and ridged or winged. Older stems are grey, developing reddish and grey stripes, and more deeply ridged. The leaves are often arranged in fascicles. The leaf blades may be as thick or thicker than they are wide, and reach 1.2 centimetres long. The flowers are paired along the branches. The petals are usually white, or sometimes pale pink. The flower contains clusters of several stamens and usually a few staminodes. The fruit capsule is 2 or 3 millimetres long.

Distribution
It has a scattered distribution in the South West, Great Southern and Goldfields-Esperance regions of Western Australia where it is often found along watercourses and in winter wet depressions growing in 
sandy and lateritic soils.

This shrub grows on granite substrates. It occurs in exposed coastal habitat and more protected inland scrubs.

References

External links

fascicularis
Myrtales of Australia
Rosids of Western Australia
Endemic flora of Western Australia
Plants described in 1828
Taxa named by Augustin Pyramus de Candolle
Taxa named by Jacques Labillardière